The 2002 Marlboro Masters of Formula 3 was the twelfth Masters of Formula 3 race held at Circuit Park Zandvoort on 11 August 2002. It was won by Fabio Carbone, for Fortec Motorsport.

Drivers and teams
All cars were equipped with a Dallara F302 chassis.

Classification

Qualifying

Group A

Group B

Race

References

Masters of Formula Three
Masters of Formula Three
Masters
Masters of Formula Three